Plantago hedleyi  is a flowering plant in the plantain family. The specific epithet honours Australian naturalist and conchologist Charles Hedley, who helped collect the species in 1893.

Description
It is a perennial herb. The narrowly oblanceolate-elliptic leaves are 7–20 cm long and 1.5–4 cm wide. The scape is 7–25 cm tall. The inflorescence is cylindrical and 2–10 cm long.

Distribution and habitat
The species is endemic to Australia’s subtropical Lord Howe Island in the Tasman Sea. It occurs in rocky sites on the upper slopes and summits of Mounts Lidgbird and Gower at the southern end of the island.

References

hedleyi
Endemic flora of Lord Howe Island
Plants described in 1914
Lamiales of Australia
Taxa named by Joseph Maiden